Indian Gardens is a populated place situated on the east side of Oak Creek Canyon, in Coconino County, Arizona, United States, north of Sedona.

History
The first white settler in Sedona, John James Thompson, settled at Indian Gardens in 1876. Thompson called the place Indian Gardens because natives grew corn and squash on the site.

In 1965, residents living along the east side of Oak Creek started the Indian Gardens Improvement Association to deal with local issues, most specifically the rebuilding of a washed out bridge which cut off access to property owners.

References

Populated places in Coconino County, Arizona